H. Taylor Howard (April 5, 1932 – November 13, 2002) was an American scientist and radio engineer. Howard was a major player in the development of consumer satellite television in the USA. In 1976, he demonstrated the possibility of receiving of TV signal from a communications satellite direct to the home of an ordinary householder, using a home-made satellite dish (actually a converted military surplus radar dish) and a self-designed and built analog satellite receiver. He co-founded San Jose, California-based Chaparral Communications. He was born in Peoria, Illinois.

Howard was a professor emeritus electrical engineering at Stanford University, and his career there spanned more than 50 years.

Howard, along with his stepson, died in 2002 when the plane that he was piloting crashed shortly after takeoff at Calaveras County Airport in California.

References
 Stanford University Memorial Resolution for H. Taylor Howard
 New York Times obituary for H. Taylor Howard

1932 births
2002 deaths
20th-century American engineers
Accidental deaths in California
Aviators killed in aviation accidents or incidents in the United States
People from Peoria, Illinois
Scientists from California
Scientists from Illinois
Stanford University faculty
Engineers from Illinois
Victims of aviation accidents or incidents in 2002